Eglė Zablockytė (born 24 May 1989) is a track and road cyclist from Lithuania. She won with together with Aušrinė Trebaitė and Aleksandra Sošenko the women's team time trial at the 2011 Summer Universiade.

References

External links
 profile at Procyclingstats.com

1989 births
Lithuanian female cyclists
Living people
Place of birth missing (living people)
Universiade medalists in cycling
Universiade gold medalists for Lithuania
Medalists at the 2011 Summer Universiade